Quedenfeldtia moerens, known commonly as the Atlas day gecko, is a species of lizard in the family Sphaerodactylidae. The species is endemic to  Morocco.

Taxonomy
This species, Quedenfeldtia moerens, should not be confused with a different species, Q. trachyblepharus, which is also known commonly as the Atlas day gecko.

Geographic range
Q. moerens is found in Morocco. It might also occur in Western Sahara.

Habitat
The natural habitat of Q. moerens  is rocky areas.

References

Further reading
Arnold EN (1990). "The two species of Moroccan day geckoes, Quedenfeldtia (Reptilia: Gekkonidae)". Journal of Natural History 24 (3): 757- 762. (Quedenfeldtia moerens, new combination).
Chabanaud P (1916). "Sur divers Reptiles et Batraciens du Maroc recueillis par M. Pallary ". Bulletin du Muséum National d'Histoire Naturelle, Paris 22: 228–233. (Gymnodactylus moerens, new species, pp. 228–231, Figures 1, 2A). (in French).

Quedenfeldtia
Geckos of Africa
Reptiles of North Africa
Endemic fauna of Morocco
Reptiles described in 1916
Taxa named by Paul Chabanaud
Taxonomy articles created by Polbot